Federal University of Agriculture, Zuru is a Nigerian tertiary institution in Zuru, Kebbi state ran fully by the Federal Government of Nigeria.

History 
Federal University of Agriculture, Zuru was established first as College of Agriculture, Zuru. The college of education was previously affiliated with Ahmadu Bello University Zaria. After the establishment of the National Board for Technical Education (N.B.T.E) in 1977 by the Federal Government to regulate Technical Education in the country, the NBTE assumed the supervision and accreditation of the college programmes. In 2019, a bill was proposed by Senator Barau Jibrin. On 21 April 2019, the bill was read the third time and passed. The new university began its operation in September 2020. In April 2020, President Mohammed Buhari appointed Musa Isiyaku Ahmed as the Vice-Chancellor and in 2021, Eze Eberechi N. Dick became the first chancellor. Prior to that, Bello Zaki was the interim Vice-Chancellor.

Library 
The University Library support teaching, Learning and research to meet the objectives of the university. The  E- Library has millions of online data bases, e- journals in JSTOR, ScienceDirect. The Library is automated with computers for easy accessibility to information resources.

Vice-Chancellors 
 Musa Isiyaku Ahmed (2020 — present)

Chancellors 
 Eze Eberechi N. Dick (JP)

References

External links

Forestry education
Educational institutions established in 2020
Forestry in Nigeria
2020 establishments in Nigeria
Federal universities of Nigeria
Agricultural universities and colleges in Nigeria